Nasir Lamine (born 7 February 1985) is a Ghanaian footballer who plays for New Edubiase United. He previously played for Ashanti Gold SC (Ashgold). Lamine was part of his country's 2004 Olympic football team; the team exited in the first round, having finished in third place in Group B.

References

1985 births
Living people
Ghanaian footballers
Medeama SC players
Olympic footballers of Ghana
Footballers at the 2004 Summer Olympics
Ashanti Gold SC players
Association football midfielders
New Edubiase United F.C. players